Consecration is a 2023 supernatural horror-thriller film directed by Cristopher Smith from a script he co-wrote with Laurie Cook, and starring Jena Malone, Danny Huston and Janet Suzman. Shot in Scotland on the Isle of Skye, the film was released in the United Kingdom and United States on February 10, 2023.

Synopsis
An English woman arrives at a convent on the Isle of Skye looking to find out the truth about her Priest brother's death, but discovers that he was himself also a suspect in a murder investigation.

Cast
 Jena Malone as Grace 
 Danny Huston as Father Romero
 Ian Pirie as Vincent
 Janet Suzman as Mother Superior
 Will Keen
 Thoren Ferguson as DCI Officer Harris
 Steffan Cennydd as Michael
 Eilidh Fisher as Meg
 Victoria Donovan as Mother
 Jolade Obasala as Sister Matilda
 Alexandra Lewis as Sister Beth
 Angela White as a nun
 Emma Hixson as a nun
 Rachael Joanne Brown as a nun

Production
The project was first reported in Variety in July 2021 with a shooting schedule set for later that summer, and an aim to pitch the film to sellers at the 2021 Cannes Film Festival. In October 2021,  Jena Malone,  Danny Huston and Janet Suzman were cast. 

The film was produced by AGC Studios, produced by Xavier Marchand of Moonriver Content, Jason Newmark of Newscope Films and Laurie Cook of Bigscope Films who was also co-writer. It was financed by AGC with additional financing by Sherborne Capital.  Smith told Entertainment Weekly he was inspired to make the film by due to his inherent fascination with all denominations of religion apparent strange essence saying "I'm never more spooked out than if I walk into a church or a temple. I wanted to make a movie about religion but do it seriously."

Principal photography took place in October 2021 in London and Scotland.

Release
IFC Films distributed the film theatrically in the United States with Shudder having the first streaming window. Consecration was released on February 10, 2023 in the United Kingdom and United States and on March 3, 2023 on Shudder. The film will be screened at the Glasgow Film Festival on March 11, 2023.

Critical reception

 Metacritic gave the film a weighted average score of 40 out of 100, based on 12 critics, indicating "mixed or average reviews".

References

External links

2023 films
Films directed by Christopher Smith
2023 horror films
British supernatural horror films
American supernatural horror films
2023 thriller films
2020s American films
2020s British films